Pradeep Ranganathan is an Indian film director and actor from Chennai, who works predominantly in Tamil cinema. He is known for directing Comali (2019) and Love Today (2022). He debuted as a lead actor through Love Today. He also runs a Youtube channel Morattu Single which has over 439,000 subscribers.

Career 
He began his career by making short films and he used to do multi-tasking including acting, editing and directing. He received his first feature film directorial debut opportunity from Jayam Ravi and Vels International who were impressed after watching some of his short films.

He made his directorial debut with Comali in 2019 which had Jayam Ravi and Kajal Aggarwal in the main lead roles and the film became a commercial success at the box office. Pradeep Ranganathan also eventually made a cameo appearance during the climax portion of Comali. He was the subject of controversy before the theatrical release of Comali as Rajinikanth demanded the film to be boycotted due to the depiction of the flashback of Rajinikanth where he promised to enter the politics in 1996 being mentioned in a portion  of the film trailer. It was also a major talking point and highlight in the trailer of the film. The scene was subsequently removed from the film following the backlash.

In an interview, he had revealed that he took inspiration from the 1985 American science fiction film Back to the Future when he first saw the film as a kid on television through a dubbed version. He usually refers to Back to the Future whenever he begin working on his films. He also revealed that he takes notes from Bollywood director Rajkumar Hirani especially crediting Hirani's two most popular films Munna Bhai MBBS and 3 Idiots.

His second directorial venture Love Today which was a modest small budgeted theatrical release in Tamil Nadu became an instant hit and surpassed expectations. Ranganathan rose to prominence and overnight sensation through Love Today. He also made his full fledged acting debut through Love Today where he played the male lead role. He later revealed that Love Today is a reflection of some of his past personal life memories indicating the film as a sweet dedication to his ex-girlfriend instead of being a revenge film.

Filmography

As director, writer, and actor

Short films

Awards
 Best Debutant Director - SIIMA Awards 2021

References

Living people
21st-century Indian film directors
Tamil-language film directors
South Indian International Movie Awards winners
Year of birth missing (living people)